Bugbee is a surname. Notable people with the name include:

Charles Bugbee (1887–1959), British Olympic water polo player
Emma Bugbee (1888–1981), American suffragist and journalist
Francis Bugbee (1794–1877), American lawyer, judge and politician
Harold Dow Bugbee (1900–63), American Western artist, illustrator and painter
Newton A.K. Bugbee (1876–1965), American businessman and Republican Party politician
Shane Bugbee (born 1968), Underground artist, publisher, multi-media communicator, filmmaker and event promoter